Vikram Kolmannskog (born September 6, 1980) is an Indian-Norwegian writer, psychotherapist, and jurist.

Climate refugees 

In 2008, as a legal adviser working with the Norwegian Refugee Council, Kolmannskog wrote Future Floods of Refugees: A Comment on Climate Change, Conflict, and Forced Migration. This became the starting point for the work that he and the Norwegian Refugee Council did to improve the rights of so-called climate refugees. Kolmannskog was acknowledged for his 'outstanding work' in this field by António Guterres, who was the UN High Commissioner for Refugees at the time.

In 2014, Kolmannskog was awarded a Doctorate of Philosophy at the University of Oslo on the basis of his sociolegal research on the needs and rights of so-called climate refugees.

Gestalt therapy  

Kolmannskog has practiced as a gestalt therapist since 2012. In this field too he has been particularly concerned with research related to marginalised groups, including trans folks.  Since 2015, he has held a part-time teaching and research position at the Norwegian Gestalt Institute. In March 2022, on the basis of his research and pedagogical work and competence within the field, he became the world's first professor of gestalt therapy.

Literature 
Kolmannskog writes fiction and poetry. In 2018, Routledge published The Empty Chair: Tales from Gestalt Therapy. This book is an introduction to gestalt therapy as well as a collection of clinical tales, and Kolmannskog has been compared to Irvin D. Yalom. 

Much of his work explores the intersections of queerness, sexuality, and spirituality. With Taste and See: A Queer Prayer, published in 2018 by Mohini Books, he became known as an author who 'reconciles religiosity, spirituality and being queer'. His work was described as 'a spiritual and sensual prayer' and 'a lyrical study of passion, both religious and carnal'. 

Many of his poems and short stories have been written during, and as part of, the Indian LGBTQ mobilisation, and he has been a regular contributor to Indian LGBTQ magazines such as Gaylaxy. On 6 September 2019, on the one-year anniversary of the Indian decriminalisation of homosexuality, a collection of his short stories Lord of the Senses was published by queer-of-colour–centric press Team Angelica. 

In March 2020, Lord of the Senses was announced as one of the Lambda Literary Award finalists in Oprah Magazine.

Bibliography 
 Becoming Buddha. Meditations (Mohini Books, 2020)
 Lord of the Senses. Stories (Team Angelica, 2019)
 The Empty Chair. Tales from Gestalt Therapy (Routledge, 2018)
 Poetry Is Possible. Selected Poems (Leadstart, 2018)
 Taste and See. A Queer Prayer (Mohini Books, 2018)
 We are in between. Rights for people displaced in the context of climate change (2017)

References 

1980 births
Living people
Gestalt therapists
Climate activists
Queer theorists
21st-century Indian poets